The Sisters is a 1914 American short drama film directed by  Christy Cabanne.

Plot summary

The plot revolves around two sisters, May and Carol, who reside in a small town. May, the elder sister, is regarded as more physically attractive than Carol. Despite this, Carol captures the attention of Frank, a country boy. However, when George, a city dweller, arrives in town for a visit, he becomes enamored with Carol and successfully wins her heart over Frank, leaving the latter in distress. On one of his visits to Carol, George encounters May and is instantly smitten with her.

Cast
 Lillian Gish as May
 Dorothy Gish as Carol (May's younger sister)
 Elmer Clifton as Frank (Carol's country lover)
 W. E. Lawrence as George (from the city)
 Donald Crisp
 Josephine Crowell

References

External links
 
 
 

1914 films
American silent short films
1914 drama films
1914 short films
American black-and-white films
Films directed by Christy Cabanne
Films with screenplays by Anita Loos
Silent American drama films
1910s American films